The Tulsa Drillers are a minor league baseball team based in Tulsa, Oklahoma. The team, which plays in the Texas League, is the Double-A affiliate of the Los Angeles Dodgers major-league club.

Stadium
The Drillers play at ONEOK Field (pronounced "one-oak"), in downtown Tulsa's Greenwood district. The team previously played at Drillers Stadium on the Tulsa County Fairgrounds at 15th and Yale in midtown Tulsa. The Drillers held their first home opener at ONEOK Field on April 8, 2010, losing 7–0 to the Corpus Christi Hooks in front of an over-capacity crowd of 8,665. In their first season in the new ballpark, the Drillers drew total attendance of 408,183, the highest season figure in the history of Tulsa professional baseball.

History
The Drillers came into being in 1977, when the two-year-old Lafayette Drillers were moved to Tulsa. Before that time, the Triple-A Tulsa Oilers had been the city's minor league club, but owner A. Ray Smith moved that team to New Orleans due to concerns over the dilapidated condition of Oiler Park. The new team opted to keep the Drillers name carried over from Lafayette—appropriate given the importance of oil to the Tulsa economy. Apart from World War II, professional baseball has been played in Tulsa continuously since 1932.

The Drillers set up shop at Oiler Park, which was renamed Driller Park.  However, it was obvious that the old stadium was at the end of its useful life, and plans were already underway for a replacement.  Tulsa County completed 8,000 seat Robert B. Sutton Stadium in 1981, naming it for its chief benefactor, a local oil executive.  Sutton, however, was convicted in 1982 of fraud, and as a result the County renamed the park Tulsa County Stadium, and renamed it Drillers Stadium in 1989.

From 1977 to 2002, the Drillers were the Double-A affiliate of the Texas Rangers. In 2002, Rangers owner Tom Hicks purchased the Shreveport, Louisiana Texas League franchise with the intention of moving the team to Frisco, Texas, a suburban city north of Dallas, Texas. At the time, the Shreveport Swamp Dragons were affiliated with the San Francisco Giants; Hicks cast aside this association and bought out the remaining two years of Tulsa's Player Development Contract. The Drillers then signed a two-year agreement with the Colorado Rockies. After the 2014 season they signed an affiliation agreement with the Los Angeles Dodgers.

Batting coach Mike Coolbaugh was killed in a freak accident on July 22, 2007.  While standing in the first base coach box, he was hit in the head by a line drive. Although CPR was administered at the scene, he died less than an hour later.  The Drillers and Travelers suspended their game, which the Travelers had been leading, 7–3, in the ninth inning.  The Drillers also postponed their game the following night.  The coroner concluded that Coolbaugh was actually hit in the neck with the line drive instead of the head, which ruptured an artery in his neck, killing him. As a result of this event, Major League Baseball began making helmets for base coaches mandatory in 2008.

In conjunction with Major League Baseball's restructuring of Minor League Baseball in 2021, the Drillers were organized into the Double-A Central. In 2022, the Double-A Central became known as the Texas League, the name historically used by the regional circuit prior to the 2021 reorganization.

Championship seasons
The Drillers were Texas League champions four times: in 1982, 1988, 1998 and in 2018. They won the Eastern Division championship in 1999 and 2002. The Drillers also appeared in the Texas League playoffs during the 2004, 2005, 2006, 2007, and 2017 seasons.

Ownership
Tulsa businessman Bill Rollings acquired the Lafayette franchise and moved it to Tulsa in 1977.  Country music entertainer Roy Clark was a co-owner of the team for six years.  Went Hubbard bought the team in 1986. In March 2006, Chuck Lamson (a former Drillers pitcher and executive) bought out much of Hubbard's stock in the team; Lamson became president and majority owner of the team. In December 2010, Lamson sold his stock back to Hubbard.  This transaction made Hubbard the sole owner of the team; his sons, Dale and Jeff, became co-chairmen.  Went and Dale Hubbard are residents of Walpole, New Hampshire; Jeff Hubbard, a former player (in 1987) and coach (in 1991) for the Drillers, lives in Durham, North Carolina.   Went Hubbard died in September 2012.

Media
ESPN SportsCenter anchor John Anderson has often alluded to team alumni as "former Driller(s)" on-air. Anderson was a weekend sports anchor for Tulsa CBS affiliate KOTV before joining ESPN.

For 13 years the Tulsa Drillers' radio (and sometime television) announcer was Mark Neely, but in January 2009 it was announced that Neely had been hired to be the new TV play-by-play announcer for the San Diego Padres.  In February the Drillers announced that Neely's replacement would be Dennis Higgins, former announcer for the Wichita Wranglers.  Since the 2005 season, the Drillers have been broadcast on KTBZ (AM), Sports Radio 1430, "The Buzz" in Tulsa.

Notable former players

 Ubaldo Jiménez, pitcher
 Troy Tulowitzki, shortstop
 Brad Hawpe, outfielder
 Jeff Francis, pitcher
 Ryan Speier, pitcher
 Matt Holliday, outfielder
 Dexter Fowler, outfielder
 Ian Stewart, third baseman
 Chris Iannetta, catcher
 Gabe Kapler, outfielder
 Iván Rodríguez, catcher
 Sammy Sosa, outfielder
 Fernando Tatis Sr., shortstop
 Carlos Pena, outfielder
 Charlie Blackmon, outfielder
 Nolan Arenado, third baseman
 Corey Seager, shortstop
 Cody Bellinger, first baseman, outfielder
 Walker Buehler, pitcher

Roster

See also
 :Category:Tulsa Drillers players

References

External links
 
 Statistics from Baseball-Reference
 Voices of Oklahoma interview with Bill Rollings. First person interview conducted on May 7, 2012, with Bill Rollings, the man who saved Tulsa baseball.

Baseball teams established in 1977
Texas League teams
Sports in Tulsa, Oklahoma
Professional baseball teams in Oklahoma
Colorado Rockies minor league affiliates
Texas Rangers minor league affiliates
Los Angeles Dodgers minor league affiliates
1977 establishments in Oklahoma
Double-A Central teams